Orontes III (Old Persian: *Arvanta-) was King of Armenia. In his reign he struggled for control of the Kingdom of Sophene with king Antiochus II Theos until being defeated in 272 BC and was forced to pay a large tribute which included 300 talents of silver and 1,000 horses and mules. Orontes III was subsequently murdered in 260 BC, whether at the instigation of King Antiochus II is not recorded. His son, Sames, continued to rule in Sophene.

References

Sources 
 
 

4th-century BC kings of Armenia
3rd-century BC kings of Armenia
Kings of Sophene
Diadochi
4th-century BC rulers
260 BC deaths
Year of birth unknown